Saint Thecla of Kitzingen (Tecla of England, Heilga) (died ca. AD 790) was a Benedictine nun and abbess. Born in England, she went to Germany to assist Saint Boniface in his missionary labors.

Background
Sometime after the death of Aldfrith of Northumbria around the year 705, his widow, Cuthburh, the sister of King Ine of Wessex, established a double-monastery in her brother's kingdom at Wimborne in Dorset. St. Richard of Wessex was one of the underkings of the West Saxons, and married to Winna, the sister of St. Boniface. Before starting on a pilgrimage to the Holy Land, with his two sons, Richard entrusted his eleven year old daughter Walpurga to the abbess of Wimborne. Walpurga was educated by the nuns of Wimborne Abbey, and later became a member of the community. Boniface, kept up a frequent correspondence with the community of Wimborne.

Life
Born in southern Britain, Thecla was a relative of Saint Lioba. Thecla and Lioba were educated at Wimborne Abbey and later joined the Benedictine community of nuns there. When Boniface wrote the Abbess Tetta, requesting helpers with his missionary work In Germany, Thecla and Lioba were among those sent. Boniface seems to have had a threefold purpose in summoning these Anglo-Saxon nuns as his auxiliaries: to propagate the full observance of the Benedictine Rule by new foundations; to introduce it into already founded monasteries, and to restore its observance in others; and finally to bring their gentle influence to bear on the local people, both by example and by the education imparted to their children.

In 748, they arrived in Bischofsheim ("bishop's place") where Boniface founded a convent, and Lioba was made abbess. Later, Thecla became abbess of Ochsenfurt. Sometime after 750, Upon the death of Hadelonga, foundress and first Abbess of Kitzingen on the Main, she was called to supervise that abbey as well.

Veneration 
Her feast day is 15 October but alternative feast days of 27 or 28 September also appear in liturgical books.  During the Middle Ages, Thecla’s relics were enshrined at Kitzingen, but were later dispersed during the German Peasants' War.

References

Sources
 Asamblea Eucarística. México: Ed. Progreso. 2009. .

790 deaths
8th-century Christian saints
Anglo-Saxon nuns
People from Wimborne Minster
Benedictine abbesses
Year of birth unknown
Christian female saints of the Middle Ages
8th-century English nuns
8th-century Frankish nuns